Jacques Molinos (4 June 1743 – 19 February 1831) was a French architect.

Molinos was born in Lyon and studied in Paris at the Royal Academy of Architecture under Jacques-François Blondel.

The Halle aux blés (Corn Exchange), on the site of the present Bourse de commerce was designed by Nicolas Le Camus de Mézières with a circular central courtyard and a double staircase. 
In 1782 François-Joseph Bélanger proposed to add an iron cupola to cover to courtyard, but his plan was rejected. 
Instead, from 1782 to 1783 a wooden dome was built to a design by Jacques-Guillaume Legrand and Jacques Molinos based on the principles defined by Philibert de l'Orme.
On 16 October 1802 the cupola was destroyed by fire.
Molinos and Jacques-Guillaume Legrand collaborated on the design of the Théâtre Feydeau (1789–1790, destroyed 1829).

Notes

Sources

1743 births
1831 deaths
18th-century French architects
Members of the Académie des beaux-arts
Architects from Lyon